John Walter Berry (December 18, 1868 – September 5, 1943) was a Canadian politician. He served in the Legislative Assembly of British Columbia from 1928 to 1933 from the electoral district of Delta, a member of the Conservative party.

References

1868 births
1943 deaths